The fx-39 is a scientific calculator manufactured by Casio released in 1978 and is one of several models to share the same physical design format.

Display 

The unit features a blue-green, light-emitting vacuum fluorescent display (VFD). The display device itself has 9 seven segment digits, 8 of which are used for numeric output, the 9th being for the minus sign or to accommodate a space for 6+2 scientific notation. Although only capable of displaying 6 figures when using scientific notation, the calculator works internally to 8. A vacuum fluorescent display (VFD) is a display device used commonly on consumer-electronics equipment such as video cassette recorders, car radios, and microwave ovens. A VFD operates on the principle of cathodoluminescence, roughly similar to a cathode ray tube, but operating at much lower voltages.

Design 

The physical design was an impressive step forward from previous, more boxy, models such as the fx-19; sporting three rows of scientific function keys, a stylish metal fascia and rather novel four-position slide switch on the right side. This switch is used to select the trigonometric mode (Degrees, Radians or Gradians) or statistical operation. The unit is pocket sized and originally came with a black plastic slip cover to protect it.

Features 

As well as the four standard functions and a memory, it has square root, square, change sign, reciprocal, factorial, pi, powers, trigonometry, common and natural logarithms as well as statistics and the following:

 Fractions. Casio continued to offer their unique rational number arithmetic first introduced in the AL-10, along with their novel use of an "L"-shaped character to display "over". Due to limitations both in working with rationals and the display, only 3 digit numerators or denominators are allowed, otherwise the value reverts to floating point.
 Time Arithmetic. The fx-39 has no real-time clock, but it can add and subtract hours, minutes and seconds displaying the result in sexagesimal. The degree symbol is represented by a small "zero" made from the upper four segments of the display (like an 8 without the bottom loop).

Casio introduced a number of   improvements which were to be continued into subsequent models:

 Parentheses the previous model, the fx-29, did not have parentheses despite also being a scientific calculator. The fx-39 has 6 levels of brackets.
 Operator Precedence. The fx-39 was one of the first to offer order of operations, where 2+3*5 is 17 and not 25. This feature is almost universally assumed on modern scientific calculators, but this was a new feature in 1978. In contrast the fx-29 did not have operator precedence.
 Hyperbolic Functions. Casio introduced hyperbolic functions in the fx-39 along with their inverses. To accommodate this, the "arc" key of the previous models was changed into the, now familiar, "inv" key. In the previous version, the hyperbolic functions had to be carried out by using the exponential (e^x) function key, employing the formulas:
sinh x = (e^x – e^-x)/2 and

cosh x = (e^x + e^-x)/2.

Power 

The unit is powered by 2 AA cells held within the battery compartment, which occupies a cavity behind the display. Alternatively, it can be powered using the Casio mains adapter through a socket on the top of the unit.

References

External links 
 fx-39 Page on ledudu's casio library
 fx-39 at Vintage Technology Info. (Domain invalid, for sale.)
 fx-39 at Voidware.
 fx-39 at Electrónica blog.

Casio calculators